South Cemetery Wiesbaden is a cemetery in Wiesbaden, Germany. It was built according to the plans of Heinrich Zeininger.

Notable burials
 Erich Abraham (1895–1971)
 Wolfgang Grams (1953–1993), member of the Red Army Faction
 Marek Hłasko (1934–1969)
 Princess Louise of Belgium (1858–1924)
 Wilhelm Jacoby (1855–1925)
 First Lieutenant Lothar Siegfried Freiherr von Richthofen (1894–1922)
 Captain Manfred Freiherr von Richthofen (also known as the "Red Baron") (1892–1918)
 Erna Sack (1898–1972)
 Ernst-Eberhard Hell (1887–1973)

External links
 

1909 establishments in Germany
Buildings and structures in Wiesbaden
Cemeteries in Germany